Charari Sharief Assembly constituency is one of the 87 constituencies in the Jammu and Kashmir Legislative Assembly of Jammu and Kashmir a north state of India. Charari Sharief is also part of Srinagar Lok Sabha constituency.

Members of Legislative Assembly

Election results

2014

See also
 Charari Sharief
 List of constituencies of Jammu and Kashmir Legislative Assembly

References

Assembly constituencies of Jammu and Kashmir
Budgam district